Mary Susanna Morgan FBA FRDAAS, is an economist, philosopher, historian, and the Albert O. Hirschman Professor of the History and Philosophy of Economics in the London School of Economics. She was Department Chair of Economic History between 2002-2005. In 2002, she was elected a Fellow of the British Academy.

Biography 
Morgan graduated from the London School of Economics a Bachelor of Science (BSc) in Economics in 1978 and a Doctor of Philosophy (PhD) in 1984. From 1992 to 2002, she worked part-time as Professor of the History and Methodology of Economics in the University of Amsterdam. Since 2002, she has been an overseas member of the Royal Netherlands Academy of Arts and Sciences.

Her most informative period occurred during her PhD, when she was working on the history of econometrics. At the time, she was part of a research group at the ZiF in Bielefeld on ‘The Probabilistic Revolution’ — a historical and philosophical project in part led by Ian Hacking. That was a time when philosophers of economics were mainly inside economics departments, not in the philosophy of science community.

Research 
Morgan has made important contributions to the history of economic thought, especially with regard to the history of econometrics, the historical development of measurement in economics, and the evolution and methodological implications of the use of economic models (see important publications list). She is influential in bridging philosophy of economics with philosophy of science, asking how economists work and think. Her philosophical work focuses on the role of narratives, evidence, case studies, and models in economics and the social sciences. As a historian of science, she interrogates how these have changed over the past century. 

She is leading a major European Commission European Research Council Advanced Investigator Grant titled "Narrative in Science" (2016-2020). Other grants include the project "Re-thinking Case Studies Across the Social Sciences" (2009-2012), "The Nature of Evidence: How Well Do "Facts" Travel?" (2004-2009), and "Models and Their Making in Economics" (1999-2001). Her book The World in the Model (CUP 2012) on history and philosophy of economics explains how economists use models and economics as a model-based science.

Most important publications
The History of Econometric Ideas, 1990.
The Foundations of Econometric Analysis (with D. F. Hendry), 1995.
Models as Mediators (ed. with M. Morrison), 1999.
The Age of Economic Measurement (ed. with J. Klein), 2001 (History of Political Economy, Annual Supplement to Vol. 33).
 The World in the Model, 2012.

External links 
 Narrative Science project page
 Interview about her life and work

References

1952 births
Living people
British economists
British women economists
Historians of economic thought
Philosophers of science
British philosophers
British women philosophers
Fellows of the British Academy
Members of the Royal Netherlands Academy of Arts and Sciences
Academic staff of the University of Amsterdam
Academics of the London School of Economics
Alumni of the London School of Economics
People from the London Borough of Hillingdon